The Oscar Taylor House is a historic house in the city of Freeport, Illinois. The house was built in 1857 and served as a "station" on the Underground Railroad during the American Civil War. It was added to the National Register of Historic Places in 1984.

History
The Oscar Taylor House was built for Freeport banker and attorney Oscar Taylor in 1857. Taylor, the son of Speaker of the House John W. Taylor, opened Freeport's first bank in 1852. The house became a social and cultural center in Freeport, hosting many prominent guests. During the American Civil War the house was used as a station on the Underground Railroad. Fugitive slaves were hidden in the basement behind a secret door fronted with shelving. The door still remains. The house was in the Taylor family until 1944 when it was gifted to form the Stephenson County Historical Society and turned into a historic house museum.

Architecture
The Taylor House is an Italianate stone house of locally quarried, rough-faced limestone. It was designed by Otis L. Wheelock of the Chicago firm, Boyington and Wheelock. The house was the first of Freeport's large houses. The house is two stories tall with a full basement and full attic. It has a symmetrical plan but its symmetry is not plainly obvious because of the building's varied composition. It is topped by a cupola above and a projecting kitchen wing below, and also possesses projecting polygonal bays and a rear sunroom. These factors make the structure's symmetry difficult to discern.

Historic significance
The Oscar Taylor House is significant in the areas of commerce and architecture. In the commerce area it is significant because of its association with Oscar Taylor, a prominent local businessman. It is also a good example of an Italianate mansion and was important as a stop on the Underground Railroad. The Oscar Taylor House was added to the National Register of Historic Places May 11, 1984.

Notes

External links

Oscar Taylor House, Property Information Report, Illinois Historic Preservation Agency, accessed May 21, 2008.
Stephenson County Historical Society, "The Museum", official site, accessed May 21, 2008.

Houses completed in 1857
Freeport, Illinois
National Register of Historic Places in Stephenson County, Illinois
Historic house museums in Illinois
Houses on the Underground Railroad
Underground Railroad in Illinois
Museums in Stephenson County, Illinois
Houses in Stephenson County, Illinois
Houses on the National Register of Historic Places in Illinois
1857 establishments in Illinois